Hourihan Glacier is a glacier draining the south slopes of Ward Tower in the Britannia Range, Antarctica, and flowing southeast to Merrick Glacier.

References

External links 

 Hourihan Glacier on USGS website
 Hourihan Glacier on SCAR website
 Time laps images of Hourihan Glacier

Glaciers of Oates Land